Twistringen is a railway station located in Twistringen, Germany. The station is located on the Wanne-Eickel–Hamburg railway. The train services are operated by Deutsche Bahn and NordWestBahn. The station has been part of the Bremen S-Bahn since December 2010.

Train services
The following services currently call at the station:

Regional services  Bremerhaven-Lehe - Bremen - Osnabrück
Bremen S-Bahn services  Bremerhaven-Lehe - Osterholz-Scharmbeck - Bremen - Twistringen

References

External links 
 

Railway stations in Lower Saxony
Bremen S-Bahn